Aloísio Silva may refer to:

Aloísio da Silva Filho, (born 1974) Brazilian footballer
Aloísio José da Silva, (born 1975) Brazilian footballer